The Aiud or Aiudul de Sus is a left tributary of the river Mureș in Transylvania, Romania. It discharges into the Mureș in Aiud. The upper reach is also known as Siloș.

References

Rivers of Alba County
Rivers of Romania
Aiud